Maurice Anthony Foley (9 October 1925 – 8 February 2002) was a British Labour Party politician.  Born in Durham and educated at a local grammar school, he joined the Transport and General Workers' Union, and stood unsuccessfully for the Labour Party in Bedford at the 1959 United Kingdom general election. He was elected as Member of Parliament (MP) for West Bromwich at a by-election in 1963.  From 1967 to 1968, he was Under-Secretary of State for the Navy.  Before that, whilst serving as a junior government minister with special responsibility for immigrants, he featured in the launch (broadcast on 10 October 1965) of a new BBC TV programme for immigrants, called Apna Hi Ghar Samajhiye (meaning "Make Yourself at Home").  From 1970 to 1973, he was the Opposition Spokesman on Foreign Affairs.

Foley resigned his seat in 1973, having been appointed as Deputy Director General for Development of the European Commission.  His successor in the resulting by-election was the future Speaker of the House of Commons, Betty Boothroyd.

References

External links 

1925 births
2002 deaths
Labour Party (UK) MPs for English constituencies
UK MPs 1959–1964
UK MPs 1964–1966
UK MPs 1966–1970
UK MPs 1970–1974
Ministers in the Wilson governments, 1964–1970